Iceland Frozen Foods Ltd v Jones [1983] ICR 17 is a UK labour law case, concerning unfair dismissal, now governed by the Employment Rights Act 1996.

Facts
Mr Jones was summarily dismissed for failing to lock a door, and taking part in a ‘go slow’ shift while on security duties. Mr Jones claimed it was unfair. The employer contended it was justified.

Judgment
Browne-Wilkinson J remitted the case to tribunal with the observation that the haste of the dismissal was probably unwise. In interpreting what is or is not fair, the following should be considered.

See also

UK labour law
Iceland was approved by the Court of Appeal in Gilham v Kent CC (No 2) [1985] ICR 233, Neale v Hereford & Worcester CC [1986] ICR 471, Campion v Hamworthy Engineering Ltd [1987] ICR 966 and Morgan v Electrolux [1991] ICR 369.

Notes

References

Employment Appeal Tribunal cases
1983 in case law
1983 in British law